David Gavin Dickson (born 20 February 1941) is an Australian freestyle swimmer who won three bronze medals in freestyle and medley relay events at the 1960 Summer Olympics and the 1964 Summer Olympics in Rome and Tokyo respectively.

Swimming career
Dickson was born in Malaya, where his father was stationed during World War II. He was three months old when he arrived in Perth, Western Australia. His schooling years was spent Malaya, Geelong and Bunbury. Dickson was a member of the Bunbury Swimming Club.

Australian Championships
 110 yd freestyle - first in 1961, 1963, 1964, 1965
 220 yd freestyle - first in 1965

Summer Olympics
Dickson was selected to make his international debut at 1960 Rome Olympics in the 4×200-metre freestyle relay. With John Konrads, Jon Henricks and Murray Rose, Dickson broke the world record on 6 August 1960, at the Tobruk Pool in Townsville, Queensland. However, in the Olympic final, swimming alongside individual gold medallists John Devitt, Murray Rose and John Konrads, Dickson finished third behind the United States and Japanese teams.

Prior to the Tokyo Olympics, Dickson was sent on an international tour to compete, along with Berry, O'Brien and Bob Windle, in the hope that their honed racecraft would help them in Tokyo. The other three won gold in their respective events, but Dickson was eliminated in the semifinal of the 100m freestyle.

Along with John Ryan, Doak and Windle, Dickson won bronze in the 4×100-metre freestyle relay. He complemented this with another bronze in the 4×100-metre medley relay, alongside Berry, O'Brien and Peter Reynolds. He narrowly missed a medal in the 4×200-metre freestyle relay, finishing fourth with Windle, Doak and Allan Wood. He finished ninth in the 100 metre freesytle.

British Empire and Commonwealth Games
At the 1962 Commonwealth Games in Perth, Dickson finished third in the 110-yard freestyle, beaten by Dick Pound of Canada and Bobby McGregor of Scotland. However, Dickson won gold in the 4×110-yard freestyle relay (with Rose, Peter Doak and Peter Phelps) and the 4×110-yard medley relay with Julian Carroll, Ian O'Brien and Kevin Berry, all of whom had won their respective individual events.

Dickson was accorded the honour of carrying the Australian flag at the 1966 Commonwealth Games in Kingston, Jamaica. He again took the bronze medal in the 110-yard freestyle, won by fellow Australian Michael Wenden, and won gold in both the 4×110-yard and 4×220 yd freestyle relays.

Australian Olympic Committee
In 1989, Dickson was elected as the Australian Capital Territory's first representative on the board of the Australian Olympic Federation. He was a member of the 1996 Melbourne Olympic Games Bid. In 1993, Dickson became an inaugural life of the ACT Olympic Council.

Employment
Dickson started as a journalist with the ABC in Perth and then became Channel Nine Perth's first sports director. He then spent 14 years in Europe including operating an import-export business in the South of France and then being appointed the Head Coach for French Swimming.  In 1980, Dickson was appointed the inaugural Manager of the National Sports Centre in Canberra that became the home of the Australian Institute of Sport. He was the permanent Australian Capital Territory Tourism Commissioner from 1985 to 1988. In 1980, Dickson was appointed the inaugural Manager of the National Sports Centre in Canberra that was to become the home of the Australian Institute of Sport. He was the permanent Australian Capital Territory Tourism Commissioner from 1985 to 1988.

Recognition
 Swimming Western Australia Sir Frank Beaurepaire Memorial Trophy in 1959/60, 1960/61, 1961/62 and 1964/65.
 Western Australian Sports Star of the Year in 1961, 1963 and 1966
 Australian Sports Medal in 2000
 Swimming Western Australia Hall of Fame in 2008
 Western Australian South West Hall of Fame

See also
 List of Commonwealth Games medallists in swimming (men)
 List of Olympic medalists in swimming (men)
 World record progression 4 × 200 metres freestyle relay

References

Bibliography 
 

1941 births
Living people
People from Perak
Swimmers at the 1960 Summer Olympics
Swimmers at the 1964 Summer Olympics
Olympic swimmers of Australia
World record setters in swimming
Olympic bronze medalists in swimming
Australian male freestyle swimmers
Medalists at the 1964 Summer Olympics
Medalists at the 1960 Summer Olympics
Olympic bronze medalists for Australia
Swimmers at the 1962 British Empire and Commonwealth Games
Swimmers at the 1966 British Empire and Commonwealth Games
Commonwealth Games medallists in swimming
Commonwealth Games gold medallists for Australia
Commonwealth Games bronze medallists for Australia
20th-century Australian people
Medallists at the 1962 British Empire and Commonwealth Games
Medallists at the 1966 British Empire and Commonwealth Games